Arlene Bawan Arcillas Nazareno (born July 31, 1969) is a Filipino politician who is currently the city mayor of Santa Rosa, Laguna since 2019, the position she also previously held from 2007 to 2016.

She was elected Kabataang Barangay Federation President of Santa Rosa in 1984 and senior councilor in 2004. She was elevated as city vice mayor on May 10, 2005, upon the death of her father Mayor Leon C. Arcillas, who was assassinated. She assumed office as acting city mayor on October 10, 2006, upon the suspension of Mayor Jose Catindig Jr., before being elected as Mayor in 2007. She thus held three positions in one term (2004–2007). She was awarded in 2011 with the Presidential Lingkod Bayan Award, the highest award given to a government employee and/or official by the Office of the President of the Philippines thru the Civil Service Commission. She then served as representative from Laguna's 1st district for one term from 2016 to 2019. As representative, she notably authored House Bill Nos. 8433 & 9080 that sought the eventual creation of the lone legislative district of Santa Rosa. She was elected as Mayor of Santa Rosa once again in 2019.

References

|-

|-

|-

1969 births
Living people
People from Santa Rosa, Laguna
Filipino Roman Catholics
Members of the House of Representatives of the Philippines from Laguna (province)
Mayors of places in Laguna (province)
University of the Philippines Los Baños alumni
PDP–Laban politicians
Liberal Party (Philippines) politicians
Lakas–CMD politicians